This is a timeline of significant events in comics in the 1910s.

1910
 January 24: The final episode of George Herriman's Gooseberry Sprig is published. 
 March 29 - June 29: Herbert Crowley draws The Wigglemuch. 
 June 20: George Herriman's The Dingbat Family makes its debut, syndicated by the precursors of King Features Syndicate, appearing in Hearst newspapers. 
 July 17: The final episode of Grif's It's Only Ethelinda is published. 
 July 26: In the panel edge of The Dingbat Family by George Herriman a cat and a mouse who will later evolve into Krazy Kat and Ignatz Mouse make their debut.
 September: George Frink's Slim Jim and the Force makes its debut. It will run until 1937 by other artists.
 October: The final episode of Walt Kuhn's Whisk is published.
 Tad Dorgan's Judge Rummy makes its debut.
 The first issue of the Belgian satirical cartoons and comics magazine Pourquoi pas? is published.
 Dutch illustrator David Bueno de Mesquita creates the prototypical comic book De Geschiedenis van Gulzigen Tobias.
 José Robledano draws El Suero Maravilloso'. 
 C. M. Payne's Those Kids Next Door debuts, which will change its title to Nippy's Pop in 1911, until finally becoming S'Matter, Pop?. It will continue until 1940. 

1911
 January: The first issue of the Flemish children's comics magazine Kindervriend is published. It will run until 1940.
 January 1: Ed Payne's Professor O. Howe Wise and Professor I.B. Schmart comes to an end, after having run since 1902. 
 April 16: William Steinigans publishes the final episode of The Bad Dream That Made Bill A Better Boy and Pups.
 April 23: The first episode of William Steinigans' Splinters is published. It will run until 1912. 
 October 18: The first issue of the Flemish children's comics magazine Het Mannekensblad is published. It will appear until 1914.
 October 31: The first episode of Officer Crust by Robert E. Brook is published. The series will run until Brook's death in 1918. 
 December 4: The final episode of George Frink's Circus Solly is published.
 Antonio Rubino's Quadratino makes its debut.
 The first issue of the Flemish children's comics magazine De Geïllustreerde Kinderwereld is published.
 Dutch cartoonist Leendert Jordaan publishes the pantomime comic Het Leven in Karikatuur in the magazine Het Leven. The series will appear until 1936.
 Hungarian cartoonist Bit (aka Nándor Honti) creates the pantomime comics series Séta Álomországban. One particular episode, A Francia Bonne Álma (A French Nanny's Dream), attracts the interest of psychologists Sándor Ferenczi and Sigmund Freud. 

1912
 February 5: Sidney Smith's Old Doc Yak makes its debut  in the Chicago Tribune. It originated in his earlier strip Buck Nix for the Chicago Evening Journal.
 May 31: John Hager's Doc's Dippy Duck makes its debut in the Seattle Daily Times, appearing on the front page. Not formally named until February 10, 1915.
 September 1: The first episode of Mr. Hubby by William Steinigans is published. It will run until 1916. 
 October 27: The final episode of William Steinigans' Splinters is published. 
 November 7: Ernest Riebe's Mr. Block makes its debut in The Industrial Worker.
 December 4: Cliff Sterrett's Polly and Her Pals makes its debut in the New York Journal.
 The Journal of Current Pictorial resumed publication after earlier ban by Qing Dynasty.
 The first issue of the Italian comics magazine Lo Scolaro is published. It will run until 1972.
 Dutch illustrator Ko Doncker creates the comics character Piet Pelle for bicycle factory Gazelle.
 Knut Stangenberg creates Fridolf Celinder. 

1913
 January 12 - November 9: Raoul Barré's Noahzark Hotel (also known as À l'Hôtel du père Noé) makes its debut.
 January 12: George McManus' Bringing Up Father makes its debut. It will run uninterrupted until 28 May 2000. 
 January 26: The first episode of Orville Peter Williams' Gasoline Gus is published. The series will run until 1915.  
 February 23: 
 Gus Mager's Hawkshaw the Detective makes its debut.
 Katharine P. Rice's Flora Flirt debuts and will run for more than a year. 
 Inez Townsend's Snooks and Snicks, the Mischievous Twins makes its debut and will run until 4 July 1915. 
 March 16: Rudolph Dirks draws his final The Katzenjammer Kids gag and leaves his newspaper. They instantly hire a replacement artist, Harold Knerr, who continues the series in his place.
 March 31: Arthur R. "Pop" Momand's Keeping Up with the Joneses makes its debut. It will run until 16 April 1938. 
 April 22: Chic Jackson's Roger Bean makes its debut. It will run until the artist's death in 1934. 
 July 6: The final episode of Red Shellcope's Jimmie the Messenger Boy is published. 
 July 19: Zif Dunstan's The Adventures of William Mug is published. It will run until 26 September 1914 as one of the earliest Australian comic strips. 
 August 10 - December 7: Charles Forbell's Naughty Pete is published.
 October 28: George Herriman's Krazy Kat makes its debut. It will receive a Sunday page from 23 April 1916 on.
 December 29: Walter Hoban's Jerry on the Job makes its debut. 
 Journal of Current Pictorial finally ceased publication.

1914
 February 2: Harry Hershfield's Abie the Agent makes his debut.
 June: Rudolph Dirks's Hans und Fritz (later renamed The Captain and the Kids) makes its debut after a huge trial between him and his former newspaper boss William Randolph Hearst about the rights to The Katzenjammer Kids. Hearst won the case but Dirks was allowed to use the characters in a different newspaper, The New York World albeit under a different name.
 April 12: The final episode of Katharine P. Rice's Flora Flirt is published.
 June 14: William Donahey's The Teenie Weenies makes its debut. 
 July 28: As the First World War leads to Belgium being occupied by German forces the Flemish comics magazine Het Mannekensblad is disestablished.
 September 26: The final episode of Zif Dunstan's The Adventures of William Mug is published.
 October 28: The final episode of Gustave Verbeek's The Terrors of the Tiny Tads is published.
 November 29: The final episode of Frank Crane's Willie Westinghouse Edison Smith, the Boy Inventor is published. 
 December 26: The first issue of the British comics magazine Funny Wonder is published. It's a different version compared with the 1892-1901 version. 
 Bruce Bairnsfather's Old Bill makes its debut. 
 The first issue of the Flemish children's comics magazine De Geïllustreerde Kinderwereld is published.
 Clare Briggs's When A Feller Needs A Friend is first published.
 Rube Goldberg starts drawing the first of many Rube Goldberg machines.
 Newspaper publisher William Randolph Hearst and his manager Moses Koenigsberg establish King Features Syndicate, which brings all comics published by Hearst's papers under one syndication enterprise.
 The final episode of Paul Bransom's The Latest News From Bugville is published.
 Bertie Brown creates The Brownie Boys in Rainbow, which is soon taken over by Freddie Crompton.

1915
 24 February: W.L. Wells creates the comic strip Old Nicodemus Nimble.
 March: Stuart Carothers's Charlie Chaplin's Comic Capers is first published. He will die on 4 October of that same year, causing the strip to be taken over by E.C. Segar. 
 April 5: Charles Folkard's Teddy Tail makes its debut in The Daily Mail.
 May 23: Antonio Rubino's Italino makes its debut.
 July 4: 
 The final episode of Frank Crane's Muggsy is published. 
 The final episode of Inez Townsend's Snooks and Snicks, the Mischievous Twins is published. 
 The final episode of Orville Peter Williams' Casoline Gus is published. 
 August 16: Merrill Blosser's ' Freckles and His Friends makes its debut. It will run until 28 August 1971. 
 August 23: The final episode of Richard Thain's comic series Lord Longbow is published, at this point drawn by Hugh Rankin.
 Rube Goldberg's Boob McNutt makes its debut.
 The final episode of Leon Searl's Mrs. Timekiller is published.
 Kitazawa Rakuten creates Teino Nukesaku (丁野抜作,, "Nukesaku Teino").

1916
 January 5: George Herriman's Baron Bean makes its debut. It will run until 1919. 
 April: The final issue of the Dutch illustrated satirical weekly De Ware Jacob is published.
 June 24: Felix Hess creates the comic strip Uit het Kladschrift van Jantje, which will run until 1936. 
 September 9: The final issue of the British comics magazine Ally Sloper's Half Holiday is published. Between 1922 and 1923, 1948 and 1949 and 1976 and 1977 it will be briefly revived.
 December 17: The final episode of Mr. Hubby by William Steinigans is published. 
 Rebecca McCann's The Cheerful Cherub makes its debut.

1917
 February 12: Sidney Smith's The Gumps makes its debut. It will run until 17 October 1959. 
 March 11: The  first issue of the Spanish comics magazine TBO is published. 
 October 28: Sergio Tofano's Signor Bonaventura makes its debut in Il Corriere dei Piccoli.  
 Robert Moore Brinkerhoff's Little Mary Mixup makes its debut. 
 Gene Byrnes' Reg'lar Fellers makes its debut.
 Jan Lunde publishes the comic strip Pappa og Pjokken, one of the first Norwegian comic strips. 

1918
 June 2: The final episode of C. M. Payne's Scary William is published. 
 August 21: Edwina Dumm's Cap Stubbs and Tippie makes its debut. It will run until 3 September 1966. 
 November 24: Frank King's Gasoline Alley makes its debut. It will become one of the longest-running comics series of all time.  Walt Wallet makes his debut on 15 December. 
 December 16: A. E. Hayward's Somebody's Stenog makes its debut. 
 December 19: Robert L. Ripley's Ripley's Believe It or Not makes its debut. 
 December: Jimmy Murphy's Toots and Casper makes its debut.
 Harry J. Tuthill's The Bungle Family makes its debut.
 Vic Forsythe's Joe Jinks makes its debut. It will run until 1971.
 Frans Masereel publishes  the pantomime graphic novel 25 Images de la Passion d'un Homme ("25 Images of a Man's Passion").
 Dutch illustrator David Bueno de Mesquita creates Billie Ritchie en Zijn Ezel, the first Dutch celebrity comic, in this case about film comedian Billie Ritchie.
 In Russia the news agency ROSTA is established, which will produce various propaganda pamphlets, among them posters and comics.

1919
 January 22: The final episode of George Herriman's Baron Bean is published.
 May 4: Carl Ed's Harold Teen makes its debut.
 June 17: Billy DeBeck's Barney Google makes its debut. It will become one of the longest-running comics series of all time. 
 June 22: The final episode of Sidney Smith's Old Doc Yak is published. 
 December 19: Debut of E.C. Segar's Thimble Theatre, which marks the debut of Olive Oyl. 
 Dora McLaren's Bobby Bear makes his debut in the Daily Herald.
 Frans Masereel publishes the pantomime graphic novel Mon Livre d'Heures ("Passionate Journey").
 Wilford Fawcett founds the American comics company Fawcett Publications.
 Bertram Lamb and Austin Bowen Payne's Pip, Squeak and Wilfred makes its debut.
 J.F. Horrabin's Japhet and Happy makes its debut under the title The Adventures of the Noah Family.
 Kristoffer Aamot and Jan Lunde start the comic strip Skomakker Bekk of Tvillingene Hans. 

Births

1910

1911
December
 December 8: Kin Platt, American caricaturist, radio writer, TV writer, animation writer, comics artist (Mr. and Mrs., Supermouse), (d. 2003).

1912
February
 February 2: Creig Flessel, American comics artist (Sandman, Shining Knight), (d. 2008).
 February 14: Ollie Harrington, American comics artist (Dark Laughter), (d. 1995) in Berlin, Germany.

1913
Specific date unknown
 Allan Borgström, Swedish comics artist (Phili Philin), (d. 2003). 

1914

1915

1916

1917
May
 May 16: Hal Seeger, American animator, comics writer and comics artist (Batfink, Milton the Monster, assisted on the Betty Boop and Leave It to Binky comic strips), (d. 2005).

1918
October
 October 16: Henri Vernes, Belgian novelist and comics writer (wrote the scripts to comic book adaptations of his own novel series Bob Morane), (d. 2021).

1919
September
 September 4: Pál Pusztai, Hungarian graphic artist and illustrator (Jucika, Iván és Joe), (d. 1970).

Deaths

1910
 January 23: Angelo Agostini, Brazilian journalist, illustrator and comics artist (As Aventuras de Nhô Quim), dies at the age of 66.
 March 16: Tom Browne, British comics artist and illustrator (Weary Willy and Tired Tim), dies at age 49. 
 March 23: Félix Nadar, French photographer, cartoonist, comics artist and caricaturist (Les Aventures Illustrées du Prince pour rire, Vie politique et littéraire de Viperin, journaliste et industriel, Vie publique et privée de Mossieu Réac), dies at age 89.

1911
 September 30: Franciszek Kostrzewski, Polish comics artist, illustrator, caricaturist, painter and cartoonist (Jedynaczek's Story in 32 Pictures), dies at age 85. 
 October 29: Joseph Pulitzer, Hungarian-American newspaper publisher, launcher of the Sunday comics and major force behind the rise of the comics industry, dies at age 64. 
 Specific date unknown: Walter H. Gallaway, American illustrator and comics artist (Citizen Fixit, Absent-Minded Augie), passes away at age 40 or 41.

1912
 May 2: Homer Calvin Davenport, American cartoonist and comics artist (A Venetian Episode - How The Doves Did Davenport), passes away at age 45.

1913
 March 18: Henry Stull, Canadian-American comics artist, passes away at age 61. 
 July 19: Walther Caspari, German illustrator, caricaturist and comics artist, passes away at age 43.

1914
 February 25: John Tenniel, British illustrator, cartoonist and comics artist (Mr. Spoonbill, Peter Piper, Alice in Wonderland, Alice Through the Looking-Glass), passes away at age 93.
 March 4: Oswald Heidbrinck, French illustrator and comics artist, dies at age 53. 
 May 3: Carsten Ravn, Danish illustrator, actor and comics artist, dies at age 53. 
 July 21: René-Charles Béliveau, Canadian illustrator, caricaturist and comics artist (La Famille Citrouillard, Le Père Nicodème), passes away at age 42 from TBC.
 October 21: R.W. Taylor, American comics artist (Yens Yensen), dies at age 36. 
 December 9:  Timoléon Lobricon, French painter and comics artist (Histoire de Mr. Tuberculus, Histoire de Mr. Grenouillet), dies at age 83. 
 Specific date unknown: 
 Faustin Betbeder, French caricaturist, illustrator and comics artist, dies at age 76 or 77. 
 Nollat, aka Louis Tallon, Jacques Talon, French caricaturist and comics artist (worked for Le Rire), dies at age 28 or 29. 

1915
 March 29: William Wallace Denslow, American illustrator and comics artist (Billy Bounce), dies at age 58. 
 June 15: Léonce Burret, French illustrator and comics artist, dies at age 49. 
 June 22: Raymond Crawford Ewer, American comics artist (continued Slim Jim and the Force), dies at age 26 from TBC.
 October 4: Stuart Carothers, American comics artist (Charlie Chaplin's Comic  Capers), dies at age 22 from defenestration. 
 November 27: Fernand Fau, French comics artist, caricaturist and illustrator, dies at age 57. 
 November 28: Georges Jordic-Pignon, French illustrator, painter and comics artist, dies in battle at age 39. 
 December 28: Kobayashi Kiyochika, Japanese caricaturist, illustrator and comics artist (made sequential illustrations), dies at age 68. 

1916
 August 21: Auguste Vimar, French illustrator and comics artist, dies at age 64. 
 December 7: Art Bowen, American painter and comics artist (The Spotty Twins, Spotlight Steve in Vaudeville), commits suicide at age 35. 

1917
 April 7: Ko Doncker, Dutch comics artist and illustrator (Piet Pelle), dies at age 43.
 October 26: Frank Crane, American comics artist (Willie Westinghouse Edison Smith the Boy Inventor, Muggsy, Val the Ventriloquist, continued Professor Bughouse), passes away at age 60. 
 Specific date unknown: 
 Paul Balluriau, French comics artist and illustrator, dies at age 56 or 56. 
 Oliver E. Veal, British comics artist (Aunt Tozer), dies at age 56 or 57. 

1918
 January 25: William Steinigans, American comics artist (Pups, Splinters, Mr. Hubby, continued The Bad Dream That Made Bill A Better Boy), passes away at age 39. 
 January 27: José María Cao, Spanish-Argentine illustrator and comics artist, dies at age 55. 
 February 12: Alphonse Lévy, French illustrator, painter and comics artist, dies at age 75. 
 February 28: Robert Carter, American comics artist (Just Little Ones, Coffee and Sinkers), dies at age 44. 
 August 3: Albert Hahn Sr., Dutch illustrator, cartoonist and comics artist, dies at age 41.
 September 10: Robert Brook, American comics artist (Officer Crust), dies at age 33. 
 October 17: Hermann Vogel, German-French illustrator and comics artist, dies at age 62. 
 December 23: Hans Horina, German comics artist (The Rhinoceros Boys), dies at age 63. 

1919
 January 22: Carl Larsson, Swedish illustrator, painter and cartoonist, dies at age 65.
 January 28: Leon Searl, American comics artist and animator (Mrs. Timekiller''), dies at age 38.
 December 9: Eugen von Baumgarten, German caricaturist, illustrator and comics artist, dies at age 54.

References